Stephen Thomas Doheny (born 20 August 1998) is an Irish cricketer. He made his Twenty20 debut for Leinster Lightning in the 2017 Inter-Provincial Trophy on 11 August 2017. Prior to his T20 debut, he was part of Ireland's squad for the 2016 Under-19 Cricket World Cup.

Domestic career 
He made his List A debut for Leinster Lightning in the 2018 Inter-Provincial Cup on 19 June 2018. He made his first-class debut for Leinster Lightning in the 2018 Inter-Provincial Championship on 20 June 2018. He was the leading run-scorer for Munster Reds in the 2018 Inter-Provincial Trophy tournament, with 193 runs in six matches.

International career 
n June 2019, he was named in the Ireland Wolves squad for their home series against the Scotland A cricket team. In March 2020, Doheny was added to Ireland's Twenty20 International (T20I) squad for their series against Afghanistan in India. In February 2021, Doheny was named in the Ireland Wolves squad for their tour to Bangladesh. Later the same month, Doheny was part of the intake for the Cricket Ireland Academy. Following the tour of Bangladesh, Doheny was awarded with a retainer contract, after he impressed the selectors.

In July 2021, Doheny was added to Ireland's Twenty20 International (T20I) squad for their series against South Africa, after Neil Rock tested positive for COVID-19. In June 2022, Doheny was named in Ireland's T20I squad for their two-match series against India. Later the same month, he was also named in Ireland's One Day International (ODI) squad for their series against New Zealand. In July 2022, Doheny was named in Ireland's T20I squad also for their series against New Zealand. Later the same month, Doheny was also named in Ireland's T20I squads for their matches against South Africa in Bristol, and for their home series against Afghanistan.

In December 2022, he was named in the Ireland's squad for their white-ball series against Zimbabwe. On 12 January 2023, he made his T20I debut for Ireland in the first T20I match.

References

External links
 

1998 births
Living people
Irish cricketers
Leinster Lightning cricketers
Munster Reds cricketers
North West Warriors cricketers
Place of birth missing (living people)